This is an incomplete list of Japanese-run military prisoner-of-war and civilian internment and concentration camps during World War II. Some of these camps were for prisoners of war (POW) only. Some also held a mixture of POWs and civilian internees, while others held solely civilian internees.

Camps in the Philippines
 Cabanatuan
 Davao Prison and Penal Farm
 Camp O'Donnell
 Los Baños
 Santo Tomas Internment Camp
 Bilibid Prison
 Puerto Princesa Prison Camp
 Camp John Hay
 Camp Holmes Internment Camp
  Camp Manganese, Guindulman, Bohol
  Camp Malolos, Bulacan

Camps in Malaya and Singapore
 Changi Prison, Singapore
 Selarang Barracks, Singapore
 River Valley Camp, Singapore
 Blakang Mati, Sentosa, Singapore
 Anderson School, Ipoh, Perak State, Malaya - civilians
 Outram Road Prison, Singapore
  Sime Road, Singapore
 No 2 and no 5 detached camp, Port Dickson, Malaya
 No 1 detached camp, Kuala Lumpur, Malaya - possibly Pudu Prison

Camps in Formosa (Taiwan)
 Kinkaseki#1
 Taichu#2 (Taichung)
 Heito#3 (Pingtung)
 Shirakawa#4 (Chiayi)
 Taihoku#5 Mosak (Taipei)
 Taihoku#6 (Taipei)
 Karenko (Hualien)
 Tamazato (Yuli)
 Kukutsu (Taipei)
 Oka (Taipei)
 Toroku - (Touliu)
 Inrin - (Yuanlin)
 Inrin Temporary (Yuanlin)
 Takao (Kaohsiung)
 Churon (Taipei)
 Tiahokum (Taipei)

Camps in North Borneo
 Jesselton camp (Kota Kinabalu)
 Sandakan camp (Sandakan)

Camps in Sarawak
 Batu Lintang camp (Batu Lintang, Kuching)

Camps in China
Haiphong Road
 Ash Civilian Assembly Center (Shanghai)
 Chapei Civilian Assembly Center (Shanghai)
 Columbia Country Club Civilian Assembly Center (Shanghai)
 Fengtai Prison
 Kiangwang POW Camp
 Lunghua Civilian Assembly Center (Shanghai)
 Lushun (Port Arthur) POW Camp
 Woosung POW Camp (Shanghai)
 Weihsien Civil Assembly Center (Weihsien)
 Yu Yuen Road Civilian Assembly Center (Shanghai)
 Yangtzepoo Civilian Assembly Center (Shanghai)
 Zikawei Camp

Camps in Manchuria
Hoten Camp
 Harbin Camp
 Mukden POW Camp
Zhongma Fortress

Camps in Dutch East Indies
Japanese Internment Camps in Dutch East Indies (now Indonesia):
  (3 camps), Rantau Prapat, North Sumatra
 Ambon  (Ambon Island)
 Ambarawa (2 camps), Central Java
 Balikpapan POW camp, Balikpapan (Dutch Borneo)
 Bangkong, Semarang, Central Java
 , Central Java
 Bicycle Camp, Batavia, West Java
  Berastagi, North Sumatra
 Fort van den Bosch, Ngawi, East Java
 Glodok Gaol, Glodok, a suburb of Batavia, West Java
  (Glugur), Medan, North Sumatra
 Grogol, Batavia, West Java
 , near Makassar, South Celebes (today Sulawesi)
 Kampoeng Makasar, Meester Cornelis, West Java
 Camp Kareës, Bandung, West Java 
 Koan School, Batavia (today Jakarta), West Java
 Lampersari, Semarang, Central Java
 Makasoera, Celebes
 Moentilan, Magelang, Central Java
  (5 camps) (Pulo Brayan), Medan, North Sumatra
 Pontianak POW camp, Pontianak (Dutch Borneo) (today Kalimantan)
 Si Rengo Rengo (Siringo-ringo), Labuhanbatu, North Sumatra
 Tandjong Priok POW camp, Tandjong Priok, Batavia, West Java
 Tebing Tinggi, North Sumatra
 Tjideng, Batavia, West Java
 Tjibaroesa, Buitenzorg (now Cibarusah, Bekasi), West Java
 Tjimahi (now Cimahi, 6 camps), West Java
 Usapa Besar, Timor

Camps in Thailand and Burma
 Anakwin
 Apalon (82 Kilo Camp)
 Aungganaung (105 Kilo Camp)
 Ban Kao
 Ban Pong
 Chungkai
 Hellfire Pass
 Hintok
 Kanchanaburi
 Khonkhan (55 Kilo Camp)
 Konkoita
 Konyu
 Mezali (70 Kilo Camp)
 Nakhon Nayok
 Niki Niki
 Nong Pladuk
 Paya Thanzu Taung (108 Kilo Camp)
 Rephaw (30 Kilo Camp)
 Sonkrai (Songkurai)
 Tamarkan
 Tampi
 Tarsao
 Taungzun (60 Kilo Camp)
 Tha Kanun (Takanun)
 Thanbaya (53 Kilo Camp)
 Thanbyuzayat
 Three Pagodas Pass
 Wang Pho

Camps in North Africa
 Tobruk

Camps in New Guinea
 Rabaul
 Oransbari - Civilian internment camp. Alamo Scouts liberated a family of 14 Dutch-Indos, a family of 12 French, and 40 Javanese on 5 Oct 1944. Zedric, Lance Q. Silent Warriors: The Alamo Scouts Behind Japanese Lines (Pathfinder 1995).

Camps in Portuguese Timor
 Baucau
 Dili

Camps in Korea
Inchon
Seoul (Keijō)
Hamhung

Camps in Hong Kong
Argyle Street Camp
Ma Tau Chung Camp
Ma Tau Wai Camp
North Point Camp
Sham Shui Po Camp
Stanley Internment Camp

Camps in Japan

See also
List of World War II prisoner-of-war camps in Australia
List of World War II prisoner-of-war camps in Canada
List of World War II prisoner-of-war camps in Italy
List of World War II prisoner-of-war camps in the United Kingdom
List of World War II prisoner-of-war camps in the United States

References

External links
Fairly comprehensive list
Lat/Long locations (Google Earth) of former Japanese POW camps in Japan
ALL-JAPAN POW CAMP GROUP HISTORY
The story of the Taiwan POWs
About Prisoners of Santo Tomas
Tjideng Camp 
Personal Memoirs of Signalman Clifford Reddish : a Prisoner held by the Japanese.
POW Research Network Japan
Map based on of WWII Japanese POW camps
A comprehensive English-language site in Japan with exact opening/closure resp. renaming/reclassification dates of the various camps based on Japanese official sources which should be imported into the current listing:
Camps in Japan proper
Camps outside Japan
japanseburgerkampen.nl 

Japanese POW Camps
 
POW
Internment camps